Edward Colston (1636–1721) was an English merchant, slave trader, philanthropist and Member of Parliament.

Edward Colston may also refer to:

Edward Colston (MP for Wells) (died 1719), English Member of Parliament 
Edward Colston (U.S. Representative) (1786–1852), U.S. Representative from Virginia
Edward Francis Colston (1795–1847), English landowner, owner of Roundway Park, Wiltshire
Edward Murray Colston, 2nd Baron Roundway (1880–1944), British Army officer